The men's javelin throw event at the 2015 Summer Universiade was held on 8 and 10 July at the Gwangju Universiade Main Stadium.

Medalists

Results

Qualification
Qualification: 76.00 m (Q) or at least 12 best (q) qualified for the final.

Final

References

Javelin
2015